Yury Aleksandrovich Petrov (born 10 April 1947, Leningrad) is a Russian political figure and a deputy of the 8th State Duma.

After graduating from the Leningrad State University, Petrov started working there first as an assistant and later as an associate professor of the Faculty of Law. Simultaneously with that, he was also working as a lawyer in a number of Saint Petersburg law firms. In September 2004, Petrov was appointed deputy chair of the Russian fund of federal property (liquidated in 2008). From 2008 to 2011, he headed the Federal Agency for State Property Management. In 2011, 2016, and 2021 he was elected deputy of the 6th, 7th, and 8th State Dumas, respectively.

References
 

 

1947 births
Living people
1st class Active State Councillors of the Russian Federation
A Just Russia politicians
21st-century Russian politicians
Eighth convocation members of the State Duma (Russian Federation)
Politicians from Saint Petersburg